Eois fulva is a moth in the  family Geometridae. It was described from San Antonio.

References

Moths described in 1910
Eois